John McKenzie Hay (21 April 1886 – 22 September 1958) was  a former Australian rules footballer who played with Collingwood in the Victorian Football League (VFL).

Family
The son of Presbyterian cleric George Hay (1843-1928), and Elizabeth McKelvie Hay (1847-1926), née McKenzie, John McKenzie Hay was born in Rokewood, Victoria on 21 April 1886.

His older brother, Robert Hay (1880–1959), played with Fitzroy in the VFL.

He married Daisy Wiliams in 1908.

Football
He was cleared from the Ballarat Football Club to play with Collingwood in 1906.

Notes

References
 (GS): Scotch's first 66 VFL/AFL Players, Great Scot, (September 2010), Scotch College, Melbourne.

External links 
 
 
 Johnny Hay's profile at Collingwood Forever

1886 births
1958 deaths
Australian rules footballers from Victoria (Australia)
Collingwood Football Club players
People educated at Scotch College, Melbourne